Marvel Superheroes Theme Park is a cancelled   Marvel indoor  theme park in Dubailand that was expected to open in November 2014. This park was originally announced in late 2007 by United-Emirate Based Al Ahli group theme park company and Marvel Entertainment.  On August 31, 2009, The Walt Disney Company bought Marvel for $4.24 billion and now controls the theme park rights to the company's characters.  Since the Universal Studios parks have Marvel-based attractions at Universal's Islands of Adventure Park in Florida and at Universal Studios Japan in Osaka, Japan, Universal owns the rights to have Marvel attractions East of the Mississippi River in the United States and in Japan, but not elsewhere.

References

External links
 Disney and more blog: Dubai World Marvel Super Heroes Theme Park Concept
 Desert Safari Dubai

Marvel Entertainment
Amusement parks in Dubai
Dubailand
Cancelled amusement parks
Unbuilt buildings and structures in the United Arab Emirates